The E44-E is an 81 mm infantry mortar produced by EBO, and now EAS (Hellenic Arms Industry) for the Hellenic Army, to provide efficient and accurate indirect firepower at the company and battalion level.

See also
 Hellenic Army
 Hellenic Arms Industry
 List of equipment of the Hellenic Army

External links
 EBO E44-E 81 mm mortars (Greece) - Jane's Infantry Weapons

Infantry mortars
Artillery of Greece
Hellenic Army
81mm mortars